

Player awards (NBA)

Regular Season MVP 
 Michael Jordan, Chicago Bulls

NBA Finals MVP 

 James Worthy, Los Angeles Lakers

Slam Dunk Contest 

 Michael Jordan, Chicago Bulls

Three-point Shootout 

 Larry Bird, Boston Celtics

Collegiate awards
 Men
John R. Wooden Award: Danny Manning, Kansas
Naismith College Coach of the Year: Larry Brown (basketball), Kansas
Frances Pomeroy Naismith Award: Jerry Johnson (basketball player), Florida Southern
Associated Press College Basketball Player of the Year: Hersey Hawkins, Bradley
NCAA basketball tournament Most Outstanding Player: Glen Rice, Michigan
Associated Press College Basketball Coach of the Year: John Chaney (basketball, born 1932), Temple
Naismith Outstanding Contribution to Basketball: Red Auerbach
 Women
Naismith College Player of the Year: Sue Wicks, Rutgers
Naismith College Coach of the Year: Leon Barmore, Louisiana Tech
Wade Trophy: Teresa Weatherspoon, Louisiana Tech
Frances Pomeroy Naismith Award: Suzie McConnell, Penn State
NCAA basketball tournament Most Outstanding Player: Erica Westbrooks, Louisiana Tech
Carol Eckman Award: Kay Yow, NC State

Naismith Memorial Basketball Hall of Fame
Class of 1988:
Clyde Lovellette
Bobby McDermott
Ralph Miller
Wes Unseld

Deaths

January 5 — Pete Maravich, American Hall of Fame NBA player (Atlanta Hawks, New Orleans Jazz) (born 1947)
February 9 — Joe Reiff, All-American college player (Northwestern) (born 1911)
March 8 — Gordon Carpenter, American AAU player and Olympic Gold medalist (1948) (born 1919)
April 5 — Swede Halbrook, American NBA player (Syracuse Nationals) (born 1933)
April 22 — Victor Holt, All-American college player (Oklahoma) (born 1908)
July 4 — Ross McBurney, All-American college player (Wichita State) (born 1906)
October 19 — Forrest Sprowl, 69, All-American college player (Purdue) and college coach (Lawrence).
December 14 — Charlie T. Black, All-American college player (Kansas) and college coach (Nebraska) (born 1901)

See also
 1988 in sports

References